Please Get Married is a 1919 American silent comedy film directed by John Ince and starring Viola Dana, Antrim Short and Margaret Campbell. It was based on the Broadway play of the same title by Lewis Allen Browne and James F. Cullen.

Cast
 Viola Dana as Muriel Ashley
 Antrim Short as Ferdinand Oliver Walton
 Margaret Campbell as Mrs. John Harper Ashley
 Harry Todd as Mr. John Harper Ashley
 Emmett King as Robert Walton
 Ralph W. Bell as Rev. Barton
 Tom Ricketts as Doctor Jenkins 
 Hugh Fay as Soapy Higgins
 Joseph Hazelton as Constable
 W.K. Mesick as Detective
 William F. Moran as Hotel Clerk
 Daisy Jefferson as Hotel Maid
 Thomas Hadley as 	Bellboy

References

Bibliography
 Leonhard Gmür. Rex Ingram: Hollywood's Rebel of the Silver Screen. 2013.
 Goble, Alan. The Complete Index to Literary Sources in Film. Walter de Gruyter, 1999.

External links
 

1919 films
1919 comedy films
1910s English-language films
American silent feature films
Silent American comedy films
American black-and-white films
Films directed by John Ince
Metro Pictures films
American films based on plays
1910s American films